Blaise Nicholas Le Sueur, 1716–1783, German painter and engraver of allegorical and historical subjects. As director of the Berlin Academy of Art, he was influential in the development of the landscape painter Jacob Philipp Hackert and historical painter Bernhard Rode.  Although he was director of the academy, he gave instruction to students informally, in his home, and only in basic drawing.

 

1716 births
1783 deaths
18th-century German painters
18th-century German male artists
German male painters
History painters
Academic staff of the Prussian Academy of Arts